Rolando Landrito (born 23 September 1945) is a Filipino former swimmer. He competed in the men's 200 metre breaststroke at the 1964 Summer Olympics.

References

1945 births
Living people
Filipino male swimmers
Olympic swimmers of the Philippines
Swimmers at the 1964 Summer Olympics
Place of birth missing (living people)
Asian Games medalists in swimming
Asian Games bronze medalists for the Philippines
Swimmers at the 1962 Asian Games
Medalists at the 1962 Asian Games
21st-century Filipino people
20th-century Filipino people